Multi-coloured 2 diamonds, is a contract bridge convention whereby the opening bid of 2D shows a defined range of hand types. These always include a weak-two bid in a major suit, and the second option, that must be a strong. The inherent ambiguity as to both suit and strength makes a powerful, and hence popular. It was originally considered disruptive, but is now thought fairly easy to defend. It is commonplace in the British Isles, permitted in international competition, but rarely seen North America. 

The convention offers several constructive system opportunities. You might choose that  its weak option  always be a standard 6-card Major, and then use 2H and 2S as eg the Muiderberg/Lucas Two two-suited weak openings.  

The strong options are also important as they may be used "garage” hand types that are otherwise awkward within your general system. Some English pairs include 2NT with 5-card major or 6-card minor. This avoids need for puppet Stayman, greatly streamlining assessment of slam prospects over a simplified 2NT opening.  

While technically a "brown sticker" convention because Multi has known "anchor suit", its popularity, and availability of published defenses, have persuaded the World Bridge Federation to allow its use even in lower rankings tournaments. It is described in the WBF Convention Booklet. It is permitted by the English Bridge Union at competition Level 4.

You may not describe 2D as "Multi" unless it is ambiguous as with respect to its weak major option

Description
An opening bid of 2D -  which must contain both a weak AND a strong option. 

The weak option must be either 5+ ambiguous major (any style) or "always hearts" ("Always spades" not permitted)

The strong option must be 1 or 2 (no more) choices taken from:

 An Acol Two, the suit need not be specified
 A strong 3-suited hand, the singleton need not be specified
 A strong balanced or semi balanced hand (±singleton) 
 Any game forcing of hand type or types

Continuation
You are not permitted to pass 2D.   

The initial response should assume that opener has a weak two in a major.  It is standard to offer a Paradox method advance. That is to say that 2H is pass/correct. A call of 2S "paradoxically" indicates that you are willing to play in hearts,  be that in a 3H or 4H contract. You have bid the suit that you don’t support!  

A common agreement is that calls of 3H and above "extend the pre-empt".  Paradox methods are again applied; 3S implies that you are willing to play in 4H. You should decide whether direct call of 4H major is to play, or pass/correct!

Should an opponent overcall or double
It is important to discuss this  with your partner. A simple agreement over double is to simply make the same Paradox advance that you would have done anyway. You should agree whether pass, or redouble show willingness to play in diamonds. Always bear in mind that fourth hand will usually make a bid, and you will always get a second opportunity to bid or double.

A common agreement is that 3H or 4H over a minor overcall are pass/correct.

Overcalls in a major suit is more awkward to handle, but a common agreement is that opener must double or bid should he hold the strong option, clarifying type if you have 2 of those.

Defending your Opponent's "Multi"
There are numerous popular defenses to the Multi. The "Dixon" method below is not necessarily best from a technical point of view, however it is perfectly adequate and is easy to remember. In general, when defending against a multi players should assume that the opener holds one of the weak options.  They occur much more frequently than the strong ones! 

With a good suit, it is important to bid aggressively on the first round of bidding, before opener's partner has disambiguated the opening. Otherwise, it is often wise to wait until it is apparent what opener's suit is. In this mode 2nd hand passes initially, A takeout double of the Pass or correct response then becomes your key weapon on round 2 of bidding.

It is helpful to discuss the concept of "position"(ie relative to opener) with your partner, in any defence agreement.

 "2nd position" double of right hand opponents 2D shows a balanced hand with 13-15 HCP or any hand with 19+ HCP, with strength being clarified by subsequent bidding (the hand will usually pass if it has the lower range or bid again with the higher).
 "2nd" overcall of 2H or 2S are natural, opening values with a 5-card major
 "2nd" overcall of 3C or 3D are natural, opening values, with a sound 5-card or better minor. (Guaranteeing a sound suit facilitates your partner calling 3NT holding at least a positional guard in both majors).
 "2nd" overcall of 2NT as strong no-trump values, usually with a guard in both majors. You should agree whether your no Trump response system is "on" or "off"
 Higher "2nd" bids are strong, and sound in any suit called.
 "4th position’s" double of 2H or 2H by responder, or of subsequent "5th position" correction to 2S by either partner, are for takeout. You should discuss when these should be converted to penalty by passing.
 Other "4th position" bids are similar to 2nd position. It is very important not to pass with opening values;  you may not get another opportunity!

Other "Multi" openings

2 Clubs may also be used as a Multi opening. It is most commonly seen in conjunction with Benjaminised Acol, where a 2D opening is strong.  2C strong options might be either the game forcing, or Acol Two hand types. 

Depending on regulations,  weak option is usually ambiguous with respect to major, but you may be allowed to include a weak, 5+ diamonds type in addition. 

Tartan Two bids allow multi-like openings in 2H or 2S, showing either a Strong Two in the suit, a weak 2-suiter including that suit, or (optionally) strong balanced. In essence they combine Acol Two’s with a Lucas Two. A significant disadvantage is that you cannot stop at the 2 level with the weak hand type.

References

 WBF Convention Booklet
 "Conventions Today", Brian Senior. Chess and Bridge Ltd, London, 2001. ISBN 0-9530218-2-3.
 "Acol in the 90s", Terence Reese and David Bird. Chapter 14, "The Multi-coloured Two Diamonds", pp 134-140. Robert Hale Ltd, London, 1990. ISBN 0-7090-4143-8.

Bridge conventions